The Algerian Championnat National 2 season 2002-03 is the thirteenth season of the league under its current title and fifteenth season under its current league division format. It started on 16 August 2008.

League table
A total of 18 teams contested the division, including 12 sides remaining in the division from the previous season and three relegated from the Algerian Championnat National, and another three promoted from the Inter-Régions Ligue.

Group Ouest

Group Est

References

Algerian Ligue 2 seasons
2002–03 in Algerian football
Algeria